Çepni can refer to:

 Chepni (tribe), one of the Oghuz tribes
 Çepni, Bandırma, a village in Turkey
 Çepni, Mudanya
 Çepni, Tosya, a village in Turkey